Manager Franco Colomba was sacked in January, with former manager Roberto Donadoni returning for a second spell in charge. Livorno ultimately finished 9th.

Players
Squad at end of season

Left club during season

Competitions

Serie A

References

Notes

U.S. Livorno 1915 seasons
Livorno